Indiana is a borough in and the county seat of Indiana County, Pennsylvania, United States. The population was 13,564 at the 2020 census. It is a part of the greater Pittsburgh–New Castle–Weirton combined statistical area, as well as the Johnstown and Pittsburgh media markets.

The borough and the region as a whole promote itself as the "Christmas Tree Capital of the World" because the national Christmas Tree Growers Association was founded there. There are still many Christmas tree farms in the area. The largest employer in the borough today is Indiana University of Pennsylvania, the second-largest of 14 PASSHE schools in the state.

History

Indiana takes its name from Indiana County, which in turn gets its name from the "Indiana grant" of the First Treaty of Fort Stanwix. Indiana was founded in 1805 to be the new county's seat from a grant of land by Founding Father George Clymer. By 1810, it had a population of 125.

On at least one occasion, an anti-slavery mob in Indiana rescued a fugitive slave from extradition back to slavery in the South. The town was also where James Moorhead, a local abolitionist leader,  published several anti-slavery newspapers. The first of these was The Clarion of Freedom, founded in 1843. Moorhead eventually sold the Clarion and founded a new anti-slavery paper, the Indiana Independent,  which he published until his death in 1857. The Independent was published by his son J. W. Moorhead after his death.

The Indiana Weekly Messenger was published in the town between 1874 and 1946.

The Downtown Indiana Historic District was listed on the National Register of Historic Places in 1993. Also listed on the National Register are Breezedale, Buffalo, Rochester & Pittsburgh Railway Indiana Passenger Station, Silas M. Clark House, Graff's Market, James Mitchell House, Old Indiana County Courthouse, Indiana Borough 1912 Municipal Building, Indiana Armory, Old Indiana County Jail and Sheriff's Office, and John Sutton Hall.

Geography
Indiana, Pennsylvania is located at  (40.6211, -79.1549). The borough is an independent municipality surrounded by White Township. For some time in the 1990s there was discussion of merging the borough and township, but the matter was never acted upon.

Climate
Indiana has a humid continental climate (Köppen Dfb), with warm summers and cold, snowy winters. Precipitation is highest in the summer months, falling as snow usually between November and April.

Demographics

As of the census of 2010, there were 13,975 people, and 4,624 households residing in the borough. The population density in 2000 was 8,440.0 people per square mile (3,267.6/km2). There were 5,096 housing units at an average density of 2,887.6 per square mile (1,117.9/km2). The racial makeup of the borough was 91.51% White, 5.19% African American, 0.07% Native American, 1.89% Asian, 0.02% Pacific Islander, 0.44% from other races, and 0.89% from two or more races. Hispanic or Latino of any race were 1.20% of the population.

There were 4,804 households, out of which 14.1% had children under the age of 18 living with them, 26.5% were married couples living together, 6.1% had a female householder with no husband present, and 65.3% were non-families. 34.1% of all households were made up of individuals, and 10.3% had someone living alone who was 65 years of age or older. The average household size was 2.29 and the average family size was 2.81.

In the borough the population was spread out, with 8.2% under the age of 18, 59.4% from 18 to 24, 13.7% from 25 to 44, 10.5% from 45 to 64, and 8.2% who were 65 years of age or older. The median age was 22 years. For every 100 females, there were 83.8 males. For every 100 females age 18 and over, there were 82.3 males.

The median income for a household in the borough was $21,279, and the median income for a family was $47,768. Males had a median income of $32,333 versus $27,831 for females. The per capita income for the borough was $12,317. About 11.2% of families and 44.1% of the population were below the poverty line, including 14.3% of those under age 18 and 11.5% of those age 65 or over.

Economy
Three iron foundries operated in Indiana at different times between 1851 and 1948.

McCreary Tire and Rubber opened a plant in Indiana in 1914. McCreary was renamed to Specialty Tires of America in 1992, and has its main office in Indiana.

Education

Indiana University of Pennsylvania (or IUP) is a public university founded in 1875, originally founded as Indiana Normal School.  

For public K-12 education, the Indiana Area School District supports four neighborhood elementary schools (Eisenhower, Horace Mann, East Pike, and Ben Franklin), a junior high school (Indiana Area Junior High School), and a high school (Indiana Area Senior High School), which are accredited and recognized for quality. A Catholic-affiliated Pre-K through grade 6 program is offered at the St. Bernard School, in addition to other various parochial schools for different denominations.

Early care and education programs for pre-k children are available. The non-profit IndiKids or (Indiana County Child Day Care Centers) offers NAEYC-accredited care for children of students and community members on the campus of IUP and throughout the community.

Local media
Indiana's local newspaper is the Indiana Gazette. Indiana is also home to several radio stations:

Indiana is served by two television markets: Pittsburgh and Johnstown-Altoona.

Notable people

Indiana was the birthplace and hometown of actor Jimmy Stewart (1908–1997), who was born there and lived at 104 North 7th Street. Despite the fact that he left the area upon graduating from high school, the town always followed his career closely, with the local newspaper periodically publishing rumors in his later years that Stewart planned to return there to live. On May 20, 1983, Stewart was given a 75th birthday celebration by the town. Before Stewart's death, a museum to his memory was opened on the third floor of the local public library, and a bronze statue of Stewart was erected in his honor at the county courthouse during his 75th birthday. The town annually holds a Jimmy Stewart film festival as part of the town's It's a Wonderful Life holiday celebration.

Environmentalist author Edward Abbey (1927–1989) was born at the Indiana hospital and raised in Indiana and near the Indiana County towns and villages of Saltsburg, Home, and Tanoma. His first novel, Jonathan Troy (1954), is set entirely in a thinly disguised Indiana, and his novel The Fool's Progress (1988), which he called his "fat masterpiece", is an autobiographical account of his growing up in this area and his imagined attempt to return home after a lifetime spent mostly in the desert Southwest. His nonfiction book Appalachian Wilderness (1970) lovingly describes Indiana and Home. There is a Pennsylvania state historical marker for Abbey.

 James H. Bronson, Medal of Honor recipient in American Civil War
 Renée Fleming, Lyric Soprano and National Medal of Arts recipient who has sung in world's most prestigious opera houses; Tony Award nominee for Rodgers and Hammerstein's Carousel
 Connie Kunkle (1958-2016), Former ShopHQ host, singer and television personality
 Chris Kuzneski, author
 Ernest W. Lewis, Arizona territorial jurist
 Paul McCandless, Grammy Award-winning jazz woodwind player and composer
 Jim Nance, football player inducted into New England Patriots Hall of Fame in 2009, was born in Indiana and graduated from Indiana High School
 Sandy McPeak, actor
 Harriet Earhart Monroe (1842–1927), lecturer, educator, writer, traveling producer of religious stage plays
 Tawni O'Dell, author
 Michael Ryan, Major League Baseball player
 Joe Saylor, Jazz percussionist for Stay Human
 Edward Scofield, 19th Governor of Wisconsin; lived in Indiana, PA
 Joe Saylor, drummer for Jon Batiste and the Stay Human Band, House drummer for the Late Show with Stephen Colbert
 Jack Sonni, guitarist and writer
 Steve Wheatcroft, professional golfer
Mary Wiggins, composer

References

External links

 

 
Boroughs in Indiana County, Pennsylvania
County seats in Pennsylvania
Pittsburgh metropolitan area
Populated places established in 1805
1816 establishments in Pennsylvania